"Going Dutch" (sometimes written with lower-case dutch) is a term that indicates that each person participating in a paid activity covers their own expenses, rather than any one person in the group defraying the cost for the entire group. The term stems from restaurant dining etiquette in the Western world, where each person pays for their meal. It is also called Dutch date, Dutch treat (the oldest form, a pejorative), and doing Dutch.

A derivative is "sharing Dutch", having a joint ownership of luxury goods. For example: four people share the ownership of a plane, boat, car, or any other sharable high-end product. This in order to minimize cost, sharing the same passion for that particular product and to have the maximum usage of this product.

Etymology

The Oxford English Dictionary connects "go Dutch" / "Dutch treat" to other phrases which have "an opprobrious or derisive application, largely due to the rivalry and enmity between the English and Dutch in the 17th century", the period of the Anglo-Dutch Wars. Another example is "Dutch courage". A term bearing some similarities is Dutch oven.

Practices

Africa 
In Egypt, it is called , meaning 'English-style', and traditionally is considered rude.

Americas 
In Northern America, the practice of "going Dutch" is often related to specific situations or events. During meals such as birthdays, first-dates or company business lunches, an expectation develops based on social traditions, personal income, and the strength of relationship between the parties. Moreover, the increase in prevalence for mobile sharing payment platforms such as Venmo or Zelle has resulted in a cultural rethinking of meal payments.

Latin America 

Some Latin American countries use the Spanish phrase  (literally 'to pay American-style') which refers to a trait attributed to people from the United States or Canada.

In this case, a person is designated as the "bank" (the one who collects the money). This system is used either when planning the things to buy for a party, or when paying the bill in a restaurant or pub. It still is splitting the bill, but one person pays for all of it and is reimbursed by the others. In more formal settings (office party) the participants may require to see the supermarket bill to check that the money was spent as agreed.

In Guatemala, a sing-song phrase is used: "", literally 'By the law of Christ, each one with his own stew'.  is a stewed dish similar to ratatouille, and is used in this phrase as a stand-in for food in general.

It is almost the same in Honduras, where the phrase is "", 'As Christ said, everyone with their own stew.' However, the word "pisto" is commonly used to denote money, rather than the stew itself.

In El Salvador, a different rhyming phrase is used: "", which means 'Spartan law: each pays [for] what they eat'.

If one of the diners asks " ('Who is Cuyo?') another may respond that he or she is (i.e that this person will pay the bill), or may suggest "cada uno con lo suyo", 'each with his own', meaning each person should pay for what they ate.

In Brazil, the slang word “rachar” is used for the same purpose, or when it’s too expensive, the group shares the total so everyone pays the same.

Asia

East Asia 
In Japan, it is called warikan, which translates into 'splitting the cost'.

In North Korea, where rigid social systems are still in place, it is most common for the person of the highest social standing, such as a boss or an elder figure, to pay the bill. This not only applies in a 1 to 1 situation but also in groups. Among the younger generation, it is quite common for friends to alternate when paying the bill, or for one to pay for dinner and another to pay for drinks.

In South Korea, "going Dutch" is called "Dutch pay", a Konglish loan phrase. For romantic dates, men usually pay.

In the People's Republic of China, after a group meal, it is expected that the bill be paid by the person who has highest social standing or highest income, or by the person who made the invitation. A group of friends or colleagues who dine together regularly will often take turns paying the bill. Men often pay for the initial romantic dates, however after several dates, it is not uncommon for women to take a turn at paying for dates. It is not uncommon among groups of strangers or sometimes younger generations to split the bill.

South Asia 
In India, Pakistan, Bangladesh, and Afghanistan was not the prevailing method due to complex societal pressures. It has become somewhat common amongst the younger generation.

In Pakistan, going Dutch is sometimes referred to as the "American system". This practice is more prevalent among the younger age group, friends, colleagues and some family members to request separate bills. In Urdu, the practice is called apna apna, which means 'each his own'. In a group, going Dutch generally means splitting the bill equally.

In Bangladesh it is common to use the term je je, jar jar 'his his, whose whose'.

India 
"Going Dutch" is a completely accepted practice in most of urban India. It is most common among friends, colleagues and couples to split the bill or request separate bills.  In Mumbai, Delhi and other cities it is commonly called TTMM, for tu tera main mera, literally meaning 'you for yours and me for mine'. It's also acceptable to pay for elders among the group if the invitation has been extended by some one younger (say a niece taking her aunts and uncles out for dinner).

In India there are many names for the practice, in different languages: it is called TTMM for tu tera mein mera in Hindi; je jaar shey taar in Bengali; tujhe tu majhe mi in Marathi; neenu nindu koodu, nanu nandu kodthini in Kannada; EDVD for evadi dabbulu vaadi dabbule in Telugu; thanakathu, thaan in Tamil); and thantrathu, thaan in Malayalam.  These all generally translate to 'you pay yours and I pay mine', though in practice it refers to splitting the bill equally. Since the concept of freely dating is comparatively new in India – a culture with a long history of arranged marriage – going Dutch is primarily not applied to dating but to outings among friends and colleagues.  When the expression going Dutch is used, it often refers to splitting the bill equally.

Southeast Asia 
In Indonesia, the term is BSS and BMM, as acronym for bayar sendiri-sendiri and bayar masing-masing, which both mean 'pay for yourself'. This term is most commonly used in less formal settings, such as among friends. In a more formal setting the commonly accepted convention is person with higher social standing to take the payments. Among equal members of group it is considered polite to offer payments for all the meals and drinks in which the other party have the opportunity to refuse or accept out of respect for the other party.

KKB would generally be the norm among friends or people of similar financial standing. As in most Asian countries, the person footing the bill is generally dictated by gender roles or their standing in the community or work. It is still general practice to have the male answer the bill especially during courtship or when in romantic relationships.

West Asia
In most West Asian cultures, asking to "go Dutch" is seen as rude. Traditions of hospitality play a great part in determining who pays, therefore an invitation will be given only when the host feels that he or she is able to afford the expenses of all. Similarly, gender roles and age play a more important role than they would in Western societies.

In Iran, it is called Dongi, which translates into 'sharing equally' and is used usually among close friends and the young when they are not invited by a specific host. Otherwise, the host will not allow anybody to pay, according to Persian hospitality norms. The practice has become quite common in Iran.

Europe 
In Italy, Spain, Portugal, Greece, and Malta, it is rather uncommon for most locals to have separate bills, and is sometimes even regarded as rude, especially when in larger groups. In urban areas or places frequented by tourists, this has changed over the last decades. 

In the Nordic countries and the Netherlands, going Dutch is the norm for almost every visit to a restaurant, with larger groups being the exception, especially on more formal occasions. Though the Scandinavian countries are some of the most gender-equal in the world, it is still common and mostly expected for men (in a heterosexual context) to pay for lunch/dinner on romantic dates. One exception to this norm is in the case of a woman asking a man out, where it would be considered polite for the woman to pay the bill. If a date is over fika (in Sweden), the parties usually go Dutch, because of the usually smaller price tag.

In Greece, the practice is colloquially called .

In Catalonia "going Dutch" is the rule among Catalans.

In some parts of Italy (especially the south), the expression  can be translated as 'to pay like people of Rome' or 'to pay Roman-style' (in reference to modern, urban Rome, not ancient Rome). It has a double and opposite meaning, depending on the tradition followed: the modern and more common meaning is to divide equally the total cost between all the diners; the other is the same as "going Dutch". This can lead to misunderstanding.

In France,  (colloquially ), literally 'make half-[and]-half', which means each one pays an equal portion of the bill. For romantic dates, the traditional practice is that the man pays. In a business meeting, the hosting party usually pays for all – it is considered rude not to do so.

In Portugal is called contas à moda do Porto meaning Oporto's style bills or a meias meaning half-half/splitting the cost.

References

English phrases
Anti-Dutch sentiment